The Nation's Favourite... is a British documentary series, celebrating music by a particular artist or popular genre, including ABBA, the Beatles, the Bee Gees, the Carpenters, Elton John, Elvis Presley and Queen.

To date, 19 episodes have been shown with a variety of celebrity narrators, including David Walliams, Alison Steadman, Victoria Wood, Zoe Ball, Matt Lucas, Craig Charles, Rufus Hound, Fearne Cotton, Amanda Holden and Stephen Mulhern.

Most Nation's Favourites are 90 minutes in duration. Each episode features exclusive interviews with the featured band or artist, as well as their songwriters, producers, musicians and celebrity fans. The series is made by Shiver.

Episodes

References

External links
  http://www.shiver.tv/show/the-nations-favourite/
 http://www.itv.com/nationsfavouritenumberone
 http://www.itv.com/beegees

2010 British television series debuts
2018 British television series endings
2010s British music television series
Television series by ITV Studios